Maj. Jared B. Fisher House is a historic home located at Gregg Township, Centre County, Pennsylvania, USA. It was built in 1856 and is a 2½ story, five bay, brick building with a gable roof. It has a rear kitchen wing and attached to the wing is a brick summer kitchen. The building reflects an eclectic combination of Greek Revival and Gothic Revival style architecture.

It was added to the National Register of Historic Places in 1977.

References

Houses on the National Register of Historic Places in Pennsylvania
Greek Revival houses in Pennsylvania
Gothic Revival architecture in Pennsylvania
Houses completed in 1856
Houses in Centre County, Pennsylvania
National Register of Historic Places in Centre County, Pennsylvania